Severe Clear is a 2009 documentary film directed by American documentary maker Kristian Fraga, starring and using footage shot by First Lieutenant Mike Scotti of United States Marine Corps Bravo Company, 1st Battalion 4th Marines. The film explores the Marine drive to Baghdad during the 2003 invasion of Iraq.

Filming

The footage was shot as Mike Scotti fought on the front lines of Operation Iraqi Freedom in 2003, he recorded what he saw on his personal mini-DV camera. The film was released at the South by Southwest Film Festival.

See also
 Armadillo, a 2010 Danish documentary about Danish troops stationed at "Armadillo"forward operating base in Helmand Province, Afghanistan
 Restrepo, a 2010 American documentary about troops in Afghanistan

References

External links
 
 
 

2009 films
American documentary films
Documentary films about the Iraq War
Films about the United States Marine Corps
2009 documentary films
Articles containing video clips
Films scored by Cliff Martinez
2000s English-language films
2000s American films